The 2012 Boys' Youth South American Volleyball Championship was the 18th edition of the tournament, organised by South America's governing volleyball body, the Confederación Sudamericana de Voleibol (CSV). It was held in Santiago, Chile. The top three teams qualified for the 2013 Youth World Championship.

Competing nations
For the first time, Bolivia send a youth team to a South American Championship, making it the first time in South America 9 teams participated. The following national teams participated, teams were seeded according to how they finished in the previous edition of the tournament; teams that did not participate in the previous championship were seeded according to ranking:

First round
The top team from each pool plus the best second place team will qualify to the semifinals.

Pool A

Pool B

Pool C

Overall Ranking

Final round

5/8 Classification bracket

Championship bracket

Classification 5/8

Semifinals

7th place match

5th place match

3rd place match

Final

Final standing

Individual awards

Most Valuable Player

Best Spiker

Best Blocker

Best Server

Best Digger

Best Setter

Best Receiver

Best Libero

References

External links
CSV official website

Men's South American Volleyball Championships
S
Volleyball
V